is a railway station in the city of Tōkamachi, Niigata, Japan operated by East Japan Railway Company (JR East).

Lines
Echigo-Mizusawa Station is served by the Iiyama Line, and is 67.5 kilometers from the starting point of the line at Toyono Station.

Station layout
The station consists of a single side platform serving one bi-directional track. The station is unattended.

History
Echigo-Mizusawa Station opened on 1 September 1929. With the privatization of Japanese National Railways (JNR) on 1 April 1987, the station came under the control of JR East. A new station building was completed in 1998.

Surrounding area

See also
 List of railway stations in Japan

External links

 JR East station information 

Railway stations in Niigata Prefecture
Railway stations in Japan opened in 1929
Iiyama Line
Tōkamachi, Niigata